Francis Mitchell (c. 1556–1628) was an English knight.

Francis Mitchell may also refer to:
 Francis Mitchell (British Army officer) (1904–1954)
 Francis Mitchell (Royal Navy officer) (1876–1946)
 Francis John Mitchell (1929–1970), Australian biologist and herpetologist

See also
 Frank Mitchell (disambiguation)